FC Torpedo Kutaisi is a Georgian professional football club based in Kutaisi, Georgia's third largest city. 'Torpedo Kutaisi' was founded in 1946 and in just three years the club became the winner of the Football Championship of that time. Torpedo's home ground is Ramaz Shengelia Stadium.

History

The Soviet period

FC Torpedo Kutaisi was founded in 1946 on the base of Kutaisi Automotive Plant. In 1949 the club became the winner of the Georgian SSR Championship. In 1959 two football clubs "FC Torpedo Kutaisi" and "FC Locomotive Kutaisi" were united and the name remained "FC Torpedo Kutaisi". In 1962 "FC Torpedo Kutaisi" became a first participant in the Soviet Top League. Many famous Georgian football players began their career in this club, among them Revaz Dzodzuashvili, Anzor Kavazashvili, Sergo Kutivadze, Givi Nodia, Manuchar Machaidze, Murtaz Khurtsilava. In addition, when Dinamo Tbilisi won UEFA Cup Winners' Cup in 1980–81, five footballers were the ex-players of FC Torpedo Kutaisi - Tamaz Kostava, Otar Gabelia, Nodar Khizanishvili, Tengiz Sulakvelidze and Ramaz Shengelia.

Torpedo spent one season in the Soviet Second league in 1988. The club also was represented for twenty years in the First league and for 14 more seasons between 1971 and 1990 in the Top league, the first tier of the Soviet football.

1990s and 2000s: Ups and downs
When the Georgian National Championships started in 1990, the club changed its name into "FC Kutaisi". But after three years the club restored the old name. The last years of the 20th century and the beginning of the 21st were the most successful years in the club's history. During 1999–02 the club won five domestic titles. Many players from "FC Torpedo Kutaisi" were represented in the Georgia national football team, including Valeri Abramidze, Sevasti Todua, Malkhaz Asatiani, Levan Silagadze, Revaz Kemoklidze.  Besides, Georgian managers (Jemal Kherkhadze, David Kipiani, Revaz Dzodzuashvili, Otar Gabelia, Vladimir Gutsaev and others) worked in the club as a head coach and in the staff too.

After the season 2004–05, three times Georgian Premier League Champion and two times Georgian National Cup Winner FC Torpedo Kutaisi was dissolved. Its last game was in Borisov, Belarus against BATE Borisov (First Qualifying Round of UEFA Cup 2005–06) in which FC Torpedo Kutaisi lost 5–0. After this, a new football club "FC Kutaisi Torpedo" was founded, but it was not the successor of FC Torpedo Kutaisi and had no titles. "FC Kutaisi Torpedo" was participating in the Georgian Premier League during two seasons (2005–06 and 2006–07), but due to financial reasons it was removed from the top league and began playing in the Pirveli Liga.

2010-2016: Road back to the success
Torpedo returned to Umaglesi Liga three years later, after winning the second division in 2009/10. 

In June 2010 the newly promoted club signed a sponsorship deal with Wissol Petroleum, which was later renewed. The business relations between the sides lasted until December 2013. 

In the first season Torpedo reached the final of David Kipiani Cup where the winner was decided in penalty shoot-out. Gagra better converted from the spot and won the title for the first time in their history. 

In the next two seasons Torpedo added two bronze medals to their tally, but a big moment came in 2016 when they won a first Cup title in 15 years. The team eliminated four rivals, including Dinamo Tbilisi in the semifinal, and prevailed over Merani Martvili in the final stage. 

In 2016 FC Torpedo was sold by the local municipality at auction, won by businessman Zaal Chachava, who was declared president of the club.

Two months before the Cup victory Kakha Chkhetiani, the ex-Torpedo player for six seasons and later assistant manager for three years, had taken charge of the club. Taking into account plans for new investments, he pledged to carry on with successful run and make a championship challenge next year.

2017-18: More titles
Torpedo won the league for the first time in 15 years in the most dramatic circumstances. A title battle continued until the dying seconds of the final game in late November. With two matches to go, Dinamo seemed comfortably sitting on the top, four points clear of second-placed Torpedo. While the former were held to a goalless draw at Saburtalo, Kutaisi won their game, and the rivals had their last fixture in Tbilisi with the gap reduced now to two points. Torpedo needed to win in order to capture the title, while their opponents needed just a draw. The team had a 1–0 advantage when they conceded a penalty in the last minute of the game. However, the penalty was saved by the goalkeeper and a dramatic win saw Torpedo crowned champions of Georgia.

Six days later Torpedo had a chance to achieve the double by winning the Cup for the second time in a row, although they lost on penalties to Chikhura.

The Super Cup was another title claimed by Torpedo in an opening match of the new 2018 season in February. Chikhura Sachkhere took the lead in 76th min, but Kutaisi equalized ten minutes later with Levan Kutalia scoring in the stoppage time. This was their first Super Cup victory in history.

Torpedo retained 18 players from the champion's squad for the 2018 season. While the club finished 3rd in the league, they once again encountered Liga 2 side Gagra in the Cup final held in Batumi. Torpedo were behind by two goals, but Milos Lacny scored twice and eventually the team won on penalties.

As champions, Torpedo played eight games in UEFA competitions this season. They knocked out two opponents and advanced to Europa League play-off, where Ludogorets Razgrad claimed the victory.

Summing up the season in December, Georgian Football Federation named Roin Kvaskhvadze the best goalkeeper, whilst Mamuka Kobakhidze and Mate Tsintsadze won nominations respectively as best defender and midfielder. In addition to them, Oleksandr Azatskyi, another central defender, was included in Erovnuli Liga team of the season.

Since 2019: Decline
2019 began with yet another success. In the Super Cup Torpedo defeated Saburtalo and won the fifth title within 26 months. 

In March Torpedo's unbeaten run consisting of 27 games came to an end. Much worse was to come, though. Financial difficulties hit hard the club again, which led to the exit of twelve players by July. The fans held several rallies, demanding the resignation of Zaal Chachava. In an interview captain Roin Kvaskhvadze described the general situation around the team as unbearable and appealed for help. No wonder a fixture on UEFA Europe league turned out unsuccessful. 

In the league one win in 15 matches brought Torpedo close to the drop-zone. Unless the problem was solved, the relegation seemed one possibility with dissolution or expulsion to a lower league being other ones. In late August Zaal Chachava announced his departure from Torpedo,
 although an overall condition was so complicated that in October the club played against Saburtalo with eleven U18 players, including 13-year-old goalkeeper Soso Kopaliani.

Largely at the expense of points picked up earlier this season, Torpedo stayed in the league, but Kakha Chkhetiani, who had spent 39 months at the helm, bade farewell to the club in December.

After a series of negotiations with investors interested in buying the club an agreement was reached in late February 2020. New owner Fabrizio Mannini announced that a new era was about to begin in Torpedo's history. 

In October Giorgi Shengelia, son of legendary Ramaz Shengelia, was appointed as Sporting director. In another twist of events, Mannini quit the club in December.

Torpedo finished in the bottom half of the table and at a decisive point gained the upper hand in a two-legged relegation tie against Gagra.

Kakha Chkhetiani was appointed as team's manager for the second time in June 2021, although four months later he was axed by new owner of Torpedo, The New Vision University, which had purchased the club at auction in September.

Honours

Georgian competitions
Erovnuli Liga 
 Winners (4):  1999–00, 2000–01, 2001–02, 2017
Erovnuli Liga 2 
 Winners (1):  2009–10
Georgian Cup
Winners (5): 1998–99, 2000–01, 2016, 2018, 2022
Georgian Super Cup
Winners (2): 2018, 2019

Soviet competitions
Georgian SSR Championship
Winners (1): 1949
Soviet First League
Winners (2): 1960, 1961
Soviet Second League
Winners (1): 1988

Friendly competitions
Commonwealth of Independent States Cup First Division
Winners (1): 2001
Turkmenistan President's Cup
Winners (1): 2002

Current squad

European history

Overall record
Accurate as of 18 July 2019

Legend: GF = Goals For. GA = Goals Against. GD = Goal Difference.

Matches

UEFA club rankings

Seasons
Key

 P = Played
 W = Games won
 D = Games drawn
 L = Games lost
 F = Goals for
 A = Goals against
 Pts = Points
 Pos = Final position

 UML = Umaglesi Liga
 ERL = Erovnuli Liga
 PIL = Pirveli Liga
 STL = Soviet Top League
 SFL = Soviet First League
 SSL = Soviet Second League
 STL = Soviet Third League
 GSSR Cup = Georgian Soviet Society Republic Cup
 DSSC = Dinamo Soviet Society Championship
 GW = Group White
  Z  = Zone
 TUR = Union republics

R1 = First round
R2 = Second round
GS = Group stage
PR = Preliminary Round
QR = Qualifying Round
1Q = First Qualifying Round
2Q = Second Qualifying Round

All seasons statistic
Accurate as of 19 March 2023

Legend: GF = Goals For. GA = Goals Against. GD = Goal Difference.

Managers

 Revaz Dzodzuashvili (1978), (1988–89)
 David Kipiani (1 July 1999 – Sept 17, 2001)
 Revaz Dzodzuashvili (1 June 2001 – 1 Jan 2002)
 Otar Gabelia (2004–05)
 Revaz Dzodzuashvili (1 June 2005 – 1 June 2007)
 Giorgi Kiknadze (1 Feb 2007 – 1 March 2007)
 Nestor Mumladze (1 July 2010 – Sept 24, 2010)
 Gia Gigatadze (3 Nov 2010 – 30 June 2011)
 Giorgi Kiknadze (1 July 2011 – Sept 2011)
 Zaza Zamtaradze (1 July 2011 – Sept 25, 2011)
 Gia Geguchadze (1 Oct 2011 – 31 May 2013)
 Gerard Zaragoza (31 May 2013 – 31 Dec 2013)
 Revaz Dzodzuashvili (10 Jan 2014 – 7 Dec 2015)
 Giorgi Daraselia (15 Dec 2014 – 5 Oct 2016)
 Kakhaber Chkhetiani (Oct, 2016 – Dec, 2019)
 Mikheil Ashvetia (7 Feb 2020 – 22 April 2021)
 Shota Babunashvili (23 April - 20 June 2021)
 Kakhaber Chkhetiani (21 Jun - 1 Nov 2021)
 Giorgi Tsetsadze (18 Nov 2021 - 2 May 2022)
 Kakhaber Chkhetiani  25 May 2022

Rivalry
In the Soviet times Torpedo Kutaisi was the second strongest Georgian club with most talented players regularly taken away by Dinamo Tbilisi. After the independence Torpedo became the first to break the ten-year hegemony of Dinamo in Umaglesi Liga. For four successive years between 1999 and 2002 they won five titles in the league and on the Cup combined. By this period the relationship between the best clubs of Eastern and Western Georgia had become tense. Fierce rivalry on the pitch was aggravated on the stands where skirmishes were not unusual. They resumed after Torpedo's reemergence among the leaders following roughly a decade-long absence. 

In 2014 the match in Kutaisi was abandoned as a result of clashes between the fans. Some property was also damaged and the police reported ten detentions. The next year some disturbances erupted during the away game in Tbilisi.

Fans angrily react in cases when a player leaves one club for the other. In 2018-2020 Levan Kutalia, Giorgi Kukhianidze, Roin Kvaskhvadze, Giorgi Kimadze, Tornike Kapanadze, Nodar Kavtaradze, Omar Migineishvili as well as managers Kakha Chkhetiani and Shalva Gongadze all moved to Dinamo. So did Budu Zivzivadze some time earlier, although he made a way back afterwards.

At any rate, most of the fans realize that Dinamo and Torpedo desperately need each other as strong rivals and healthy competition between them would only contribute to a better quality of Erovnuli Liga.

Notes and references

External links
 Official page of FC Torpedo Kutaisi in English

 
Football clubs in Georgia (country)
Sport in Kutaisi
Association football clubs established in 1946
1946 establishments in Georgia (country)
Soviet Top League clubs
Works association football teams